A Mayo County Council election was held in Ireland on 23 May 2014 as part of that year's local elections. Thirty councillors were elected for a five-year term of office from four local electoral areas by proportional representation with a single transferable vote. This represented a reduction of 1 councillor since 2009 and 1 a reduction in 2 electoral areas.

While Fine Gael remained the most popular party in Mayo in terms of vote share the party surrendered its previously held overall majority on Mayo County Council and lost 7 seats in the process to be reduced to 10 councillors. Several long-serving members lost their seats in the process and the Taoiseach's brother, Henry Kenny, was a near casualty in Castlebar. Fianna Fáil gained 3 seats in the election to return with 10 councillors, the same numbers as Fine Gael. Their gains came in Ballina, Castlebar and in Claremorris. The party missed out on an additional seat in West Mayo due to running too many candidates, transfer leakage and the fact that the previous incumbents had retired. Sinn Féin made modest gains by gaining a seat in Castlebar to add to their delegation, although the party was very close in Ballina. Independents garnered a large vote share in each LEA and increased their numbers to 7 seats.

Results by party

Results by Electoral Area

Ballina

Sources:
 Election Results RTÉ News
 Ballina Mayo County Council

Castlebar

Sources:
 Election Results RTÉ News
  Castlebar Election Results

Claremorris

Sources:
 Election Results RTÉ News
  Claremorris Election Results

West Mayo

Sources:
 Election Results RTÉ News
 West Mayo Mayo County Council

References

Post-Election Changes
† Castlebar - Fianna Fáil Councillor Lisa Chambers was elected as a TD for Mayo at the Irish general election, 2016. Michael McLoughlin was co-opted to fill the vacancy on 14 March 2016.
†† West Mayo - Sinn Féin Councillor Rose Conway-Walsh was elected to Seanad Eireann in April 2016. Teresa Whelan was co-opted to fill the vacancy on 11 July 2016.
††† Castlebar Sinn Féin Councillor Therese Ruane resigned her seat in December 2017 citing work commitments. Joe McHale was co-opted to fill the vacancy. 
†††† Ballina Independent Councillor Gerry Ginty joined Peadar Tóibín's movement on 27 November 2018.

External links
 Official website

2014 Irish local elections
2014